Room to Breathe is the fourth and last studio album released by ZOEgirl.

Track listing

Personnel 
ZOEgirl
 Alisa Childers – vocals, acoustic guitar 
 Chrissy Katina – vocals 
 Kristin Schweain – vocals 

Musicians
 Robert "Aurel M" Marvin – programming, acoustic piano 
 Mark Heimmerman – keyboards, programming, acoustic piano 
 Shaun Shankel – keyboards 
 Brandon Harris – programming, guitars
 Damon Riley – programming 
 George Cocchini – guitars 
 Brent Milligan – guitars 
 Pete Kipley – guitars 
 Lynn Nichols – guitars, electric guitar 
 Chris Rodriguez – acoustic guitar 
 Jackie Street – bass 
 James Katina – bass
 Dan Needham – drums 
 Chris McHugh – drums 
 Mike Childers – drums 
 Andy Selby – string arrangements 
 Claire Indie – cello
 David Davidson – viola, violin 
 Christa Black – violin 

Production
 Brent Milligan – executive producer 
 Doubledutch – producers (1, 5, 6, 7, 10)
 Mark Heimmerman (2, 4)
 Shaun Shankel – producer (3)
 Tedd T – producer (7, 8, 9)
 Robert Marvin – editing 
 Jan Cook – creative director 
 Alexis Goodman – art direction, design 
 Dana Tynan – photography 
 David Kaufman – wardrobe 
 David Cox – hair stylist

Reception
Room to Breathe received generally favourable reviews. JesusfreakHideout gave it 4 stars and said "Room to Breathe is as relevant and bold as ever". CCM also gave it high ratings saying "Room to Breathe is a solid, wisely produced collection".

Chart performance
Room to Breathe peaked at No. 108 on the Billboard 200. It peaked at No. 5 on Billboard Top Christian Albums and reached the No. 1 spot on Billboard Heetseekers chart.

References

2005 albums
ZOEgirl albums
Sparrow Records albums